Mark B. Sobell, Ph.D., ABPP, a professor at the College of Psychology of Nova Southeastern University in Fort Lauderdale, Florida,  is a specialist in addiction. Dr. Mark Sobell is nationally and internationally known for his research in the addiction field. He is a Fellow of the American Psychological Association in Divisions 1, 3, 12, 25, 28, and 50, and is Board Certified in Cognitive and Behavioral Psychology by the American Board of Professional Psychology. He is the co-director of Healthy Lifestyles: Guided Self-Change at Nova Southeastern University.

He is the author or editor of 9 books and has published over 270 peer-reviewed articles.  He is the Associate Editor of the American Psychologist and the Journal of Consulting and Clinical Psychology.  Along with this, he serves on 5 peer-reviewed editorial boards. He is the past president of the Society of Clinical Psychology of the APA, and is on the APA Publications and Communications Board.

Education

Sobell received his Ph.D. in clinical psychology from the University of California, Riverside in 1970 with a thesis "A paired comparison method for assessing stimulus control with an application to DRL schedules".

Awards 
 Distinguished Scientific Contribution Award from Society of Clinical Psychology, APA
 2008 Charles C. Shepard Science Award (About Charles C. Shepard Award)
 for most outstanding peer-reviewed research paper on prevent and control published by Centers for Disease Control/ATSDR scientists in 2007
 Lifetime Achievement Award from Addictions Special Interest Group, Association for Behavioral and Cognitive Therapies
 Jellinek Memorial Award (Jellinek Award)
 for outstanding contributions to knowledge in the field of alcohol studies
 Distinguished Scientific Contributions to the Application of Psychology Award
 Brady/Schuster Award for Outstanding Behavioral Science Research in Psychopharmacology and Substance Abuse

Books 

 Pattison, E.M., Sobell, M.B., & Sobell, L.C. (Eds.) (1977). Emerging concepts of alcohol dependence. New York: Springer.
Selection of: Behavioral Sciences Book Service, Mental Health Practitioners Book Club, Listed in the Society of Clinical Psychology’s (Division 12, APA) website for Research-Supported Psychological Treatment. Listed as Guided Self-Change for Mixed Substance Abuse/Dependence 
 Sobell, M.B. & Sobell, L.C. (1978). Behavioral treatment of alcohol problems: Individualized therapy and controlled drinking. New York: Plenum Press.
Translated into Italian. 
 Sobell, L.C., Sobell, M.B., & Ward, E. (Eds.). (1980). Evaluating alcohol and drug abuse treatment effectiveness: Recent advances. New York: Pergamon Press.
 Sobell, M.B. & Sobell, L.C. (Eds.). (1987). Moderation as a goal or outcome of treatment for alcohol problems: A dialogue. New York: Haworth Press.
Book version of Drugs & Society, Special Issue.
 Sobell, M.B. & Sobell, L. C. (1993). Problem drinkers: Guided self-change treatment. New York: Guilford Press.
 Selection of:  Behavioral Sciences Book Service. Psychotherapy Book Club. 
 Klingemann, H., Sobell, L. C., Barker, J., Blomqvist, J., Cloud, W., Ellingstad, T. P., Finfgeld, D., Granfield, R., Hodgins, D., Hunt, G., Junker, C., Peele, S., Smart, R., Sobell, M. B., & Tucker, J. (2001). Promoting self-change from problem substance use: Practical implications for policy, prevention, and treatment. Netherlands: Kluwer Academic Publishers.
 Sobell, L. C. & Sobell, M. B. (2011). Group therapy for substance use disorders: A motivational cognitive-behavioral approach. New York: Guilford Press.  
 Translated into Portuguese by Artmed Editora.  To be translated into Spanish by Ediciones Piramide
 Velasquez, M. M., Ingersoll, K. S., Sobell, M. B., & Sobell, L.C. (in press, 2015 ). Women and drinking: Preventing alcohol exposed pregnancies. Cambridge, MA: Hogrefe.

References

Date of birth missing (living people)
Living people
Nova Southeastern University faculty
21st-century American psychologists
Year of birth missing (living people)